Jordi Farràs Forné  is an Andorran politician. He served in the General Parliament of Andorra as President between 1992 and 1994. Forné is a member of the Democratic Party.

References

General Syndics of the General Council (Andorra)
Living people
Year of birth missing (living people)
Democratic Party (Andorra) politicians
Place of birth missing (living people)